Joseph Charles Hippolyte Crosse (1 October 1826 in Paris – 7 August 1898) was a French conchologist.

With Paul-Henri Fischer (1835–1893) he was co-editor of Journal de Conchyliologie (from 1861). Crosse was the author of over 300 works on Mollusca.

He lived in the Château d'Argeville near Fontainebleau and died there on 7 August 1898. The first Journal de Conchyliologie issue of 1899 was dedicated to his life and work.

Works
Notice sur les bulimes de la Nouvelle-Calédonie, et description de deux espèces nouvelles (1855).
Descriptions de coquilles nouvelles (1859).
Un Mollusque bien maltraité, ou Comment M. Victor-Hugo comprend l'organisation du poulpe (1866).
Diagnoses molluscorum novorum Guatemalae et Reipublicae Mexicanae (1868).
Études sur les mollusques terrestres et fluviatiles du Mexique et du Guatémala (avec Paul Fischer, 1870–1900).
Contribution à la faune malacologique de Nossi-Bé et de Nossi-Comba (1882).
Histoire physique, naturelle et politique de Madagascar, publiée par Alfred Grandidier. Volume XXV. Histoire naturelle des mollusques (avec Paul Fischer, 1889).
Faune malacologique terrestre et fluviatile de l'Ile de al Trinité (Antilles) (1890).
Faune malacologique terrestre et fluviatile de la Nouvelle-Calédonie et de ses dépendances (1894).

References 

 Obituary: Journal de conchyliologie.t. 47 ser. 47 (1899) 

Conchologists
French malacologists
1826 births
1898 deaths
Scientists from Paris